Avraham Gorali (October 15, 1911 – October 11, 1954) was the first Chief Military Prosecutor of Israel. He helped formulate Israel military justice.  He was succeeded by Aharon Hoter-Yishai.

Biography
Avraham Gorali was born in Kovel, Poland and studied law in Vilna. In 1934, he moved to Mandate Palestine. He worked as research assistant at Hebrew University where his received his doctorate.
 
In 1954, he was killed  in a road accident.

Legal career
Gorali founded the Law Library Publishing House. From 1936, he handled the cases of Haganah prisoners in British prison and their release.

References

Military Advocate Generals of the Israel Defense Forces
1911 births
1954 deaths
Road incident deaths in Israel
Polish emigrants to Mandatory Palestine